A cricket team from England organised by the Marylebone Cricket Club (MCC) toured India from 3 January to 24 February 1964. They played five Test matches, all of which were drawn, against the India national cricket team, along with other matches against domestic Indian clubs. In the Test matches, the side was known as "England"; in other matches, it was known as "MCC". The first Test of the series, at Madras, was the 400th Test match to be played by England.

Test matches

1st Test

2nd Test

3rd Test

4th Test

5th Test

Other matches

Indian Board president's XI v Marylebone Cricket Club

South Zone v. Marylebone Cricket Club

References

Notes
 Playfair Cricket Annual 1964
 Wisden Cricketers Almanack 1965

External links
 CricketArchive tour itinerary

1963 in English cricket
1963 in Indian cricket
1964 in English cricket
1964 in Indian cricket
1963-64
Indian cricket seasons from 1945–46 to 1969–70
International cricket competitions from 1960–61 to 1970